Slavkov u Brna is a town in Vyškov District in the South Moravian Region of the Czech Republic. It has about 7,000 inhabitants. The town gave its name to the Battle of Austerlitz which took place several kilometres west of the town. The historic town centre is well preserved and is protected by law as an urban monument zone.

Etymology
The German name Austerlitz is derived from Latin Nova sedes (i.e. "new settlement"), which has gradually evolved over history through the names Novosedeliz (1237), Nausedlicz (1322), Neusserlicz (1343), Nausterlitz (1460) and Austerlitz (1611). The Czech name Slavkov is derived from Slávek (colloquial name of Bohuslav), who probably owned a manor house here. The Czech name was first documented in 1361. In 1918, Slavkov was renamed Slavkov u Brna ("Slavkov near Brno") to distinguish from other places with the same name.

Geography
It is situated on the border of three geomorphological regions: the northeastern part of the municipal territory lies in the Litenčice Hills, the northwestern part lies in the Dyje–Svratka Valley, and the southern part extends into the Ždánice Forest. The Litava River flows through the town.

History

At the end of the 12th century, Margrave Vladislaus III gave the area to the Teutonic Order. The first written mention of Slavkov is from 1237 in a deed of Wenceslaus I. It was originally a market village with a fortified stronghold and a church, located at the crossroads of trade routes. The Teutonic Order founded a commandery here.

From 1396 to 1407, Slavkov was held by Jobst of Moravia. In 1407, it was returned to the Teutonic Order, but after the defeat of the Order in the Battle of Grunwald, Slavkov was confiscated from them in 1411.

In the 14th century, a Jewish ghetto was established near the commandery. The merger of the Christian and Jewish communities created a strong economic agglomeration, which was promoted to a town by King Wenceslaus IV in 1416. The town was strongly fortified and had four gates.

The town often changed owners until 1509, when the noble family of Kaunitz assumed control for more than 400 years. They made it the main seat of the family.

Demographics

Sights

On the site of the old fortress was built a Renaissance residence at the end of the 16th century. The Slavkov Castle was rebuilt to the current Baroque form by Italian architect Domenico Martinelli in the 1680s. It belongs to the oldest preserved noble residences in Moravia. In its historic salon, an armistice was signed between Austria and France after the Battle of Austerlitz on 2 December 1805. There is a small museum and a multimedia presentation about the battle. The castle includes a French formal garden, part of which was simplified into an English park.

The landmarks of the town square are the late Renaissance town hall from 1592 and a mansion. Remains of the town walls from the 14th and 15th centuries have been preserved to this day.

The parish Church of the Resurrection of the Lord is a late Baroque and Neoclassical building, built in 1786–1789. It has three pulpits. The church was designed by Johann Ferdinand Hetzendorf of Hohenberg.

The cemetery Chapel of Saint John the Baptist is located on the site of a hospital from the 13th century. Its current appearance is from 1743. Beneath the church is a vault with the Kaunitz family tomb.

Chapel of Saint Urban on the Urban Hill was built by design of Domenico Martinelli in 1712. It was badly damaged during the Battle of Austerlitz and had to be rebuilt in 1858–1861.

Only the synagogue built in 1858 remains from the Jewish ghetto. There is also a Jewish cemetery.

Trivia
Much in the same way that in London, the English have named Waterloo Station to commemorate their victory at Waterloo, the French gave the name of Austerlitz to one of the major Parisian train stations, the Gare d'Austerlitz, the neighbouring bridge Pont d'Austerlitz, and the waterfront Quai d'Austerlitz. In the Netherlands, a village named Austerlitz was founded in commemoration of the battle, as was a small town of Austerlitz, New York.

Notable people
Abraham Aberle (1811–1841), poet and translator
František Koláček (1851–1913), physicist
Peregrin Obdržálek (1825–1891), Catholic priest, writer and humorist
Lubomír Tesáček (1957–2011), athlete

Austerlitz is a Jewish family name, of which the bearers are nowadays spread worldwide but which indicate and ultimate family origin in the town. The dancer Fred Astaire was born Fred Austerlitz, and thus it could be assumed that his ancestors lived in this town.

Twin towns – sister cities

Slavkov u Brna is twinned with:
 Darney, France
 Horn, Austria
 Pag, Croatia
 Sławków, Poland
 Zeist, Netherlands

Gallery

References

External links

Official website of Slavkov Castle
Slavkov u Brna on zamky-hrady.cz
Jewish Encyclopedia

Cities and towns in the Czech Republic
Shtetls
Populated places in Vyškov District